Desulfocapsa sulfexigens is a mesophilic, anaerobic, gram-negative bacterium. It disproportionates elemental sulfur and thiosulfate. SB164P1 is its type strain.

References

Further reading
Finster, Kai W., et al. "Complete genome sequence of Desulfocapsa sulfexigens, a marine deltaproteobacterium specialized in disproportionating inorganic sulfur compounds." Standards in Genomic Sciences 8.1 (2013).

External links

LPSN
WORMS entry
Type strain of Desulfocapsa sulfexigens at BacDive -  the Bacterial Diversity Metadatabase

Desulfobacterales
Bacteria described in 1998